The 1948-49 Oberliga season was the first season of the Oberliga, the top level of ice hockey in Germany. Six teams participated in the league, and EV Füssen won the championship.

Regular season

References

Oberliga (ice hockey) seasons
West
Ger